Peter Fox (30 March 1933 – 25 February 2019) was an English rugby league footballer who played in the 1950s and 1960s, and coached in the 1970s, 1980s and 1990s. He was the brother of Don and Neil Fox, and together they formed one of the legendary rugby league families.

Career 
He had a 13-year playing career with; Sharlston Rovers, Featherstone Rovers (Heritage № 349), Batley, Hull Kingston Rovers (Heritage №), Hunslet and Wakefield Trinity (Heritage № 723), he became one of British rugby league's most successful coaches.

Peter Fox was the coach in Featherstone Rovers' 33-14 victory over Bradford Northern in the 1973 Challenge Cup Final during the 1972–73 season at Wembley Stadium, London on Saturday 12 May 1973, in front of a crowd of 72,395, and was the coach in the 9-24 defeat by Warrington in the 1974 Challenge Cup Final during the 1973–74 season at Wembley Stadium, London on Saturday 11 May 1974, in front of a crowd of 77,400.

Bramley won promotion to Division One, under Peter Fox in the 1976-77 season.

He coached Great Britain and England, which included beating the Australians in 1978.

He coached Bradford Northern in two spells one in 1977 where he had a very successful spell winning the championship in 1979-80 and 1980-81.

He returned to Bradford Northern for a second spell in 1991, and in the 1993-94 season Bradford Northern finish as runners-up in the Championship behind Wigan on points difference. He left the club in 1995.

Fox also coached Yorkshire in the Rodstock War of the Roses series, winning all six games played against Lancashire between 1985 and 1991.

Fox appears to have scored no drop-goals (or field-goals as they are currently known in Australasia), but prior to the 1974–75 season all goals, whether; conversions, penalties, or drop-goals, scored 2-points, consequently prior to this date drop-goals were often not explicitly documented, therefore '0' drop-goals may indicate drop-goals not recorded, rather than no drop-goals scored.

Honoured at Featherstone Rovers
Peter Fox is a Featherstone Rovers Hall of Fame inductee.

References

External links
Peter Fox's biography at worldofsport.com
Coach statistics at rugbyleagueproject.org

1933 births
2019 deaths
Batley Bulldogs players
Bradford Bulls coaches
Bramley R.L.F.C. coaches
England national rugby league team coaches
English rugby league coaches
English rugby league players
Featherstone Rovers coaches
Featherstone Rovers players
Great Britain national rugby league team coaches
Hull Kingston Rovers players
Hunslet F.C. (1883) players
Leeds Rhinos coaches
People from Sharlston
Rugby league players from Wakefield
Wakefield Trinity players
Wakefield Trinity coaches
Yorkshire rugby league team coaches